A monal is a bird of genus Lophophorus of the pheasant family, Phasianidae.

Description
The males all have colorful, iridescent plumage. Their physique is rather plump. Their diet consists of plants such as roots and bulbs and insects.  During mating the males are polygamous where they mates with several females. The females in turn only mate with the selected male and enter into a monogamous relationship. Due to habitat destruction and hunting, they have become rare and their population is endangered.

Species
There are three species and several subspecies:

References

External links 
 
 

Bird genera